Arnold Brown may refer to:

 Arnold Brown (comedian) (born 1936), Scottish comedian
 Arnold Brown (General of The Salvation Army) (1913–2002)
 Arnold Brown (politician) (1927–1994), politician in Manitoba, Canada
 Arnold Brown (soldier) (1894–1960), Australian army officer
 Arnold E. Brown (born 1932), American politician in the New Jersey Legislature
 Arnold M. Brown (born 1931), American politician in South Dakota
 Arnie Brown (1942–2019), Canadian ice hockey player